Kfar Shmuel (lit. Shmuel Village) is a moshav in central Israel. Located in the Shephelah around six kilometres south of Ramle, it falls under the jurisdiction of Gezer Regional Council.

History
The moshav was founded on 4 January 1950 by immigrants from Romania on the land of the depopulated  Palestinian village of Innaba,  which was occupied by Israeli forces on 10 July 1948. It was named after Stephen Samuel (Shmuel) Wise, an American Reform rabbi and Zionist leader.

See also
HaNoar HaTzioni

References 

Moshavim
Populated places established in 1950
1950 establishments in Israel
Populated places in Central District (Israel)
Romanian-Jewish culture in Israel